Cupid's Kitchen is a 2022 inspirational youth urban emotional Chinese drama based on Jiao Tang Dong Gua's novel of the same name, directed by Li Jun and starring Ruan Jingtian, Song Zuer, Liu Dongqin, Wang Zhuocheng, Wang Ruizi, Xu Jiawen, and Liu Linger. It tells the story of Lin Kesong, a girl with an amazing sense of taste, who happens to meet Jiang Qianfan, a chef in the Chinese gourmet world, and they start a story of food and love together. The drama will be broadcast on Zhejiang Satellite TV from January 13, 2022, and will be broadcast simultaneously on Tencent Video, iQiyi, and Youku Video.

Plot 
Lin Kesong (played by Song Zuer), a little girl with a gift for taste, likes her classmate Song Yiran (played by Liu Dongqin) and chased her to Shanghai, where she accidentally met Jiang Qianfan (played by Ruan Jingtian), a Michelin-starred chef. Jiang Qianfan took Lin Kesong as his apprentice and taught her cooking skills, and they also prepared to participate in a cooking competition three months later. Although Lin Kesong has a genius sense of taste, he knows nothing about cooking. After Jiang Qianfan's devilish training and innovation, Lin Kesong actually has her own set of special cooking skills, and she gradually found confidence in the process and became a better version of herself. During this process, Song Yiran gradually fell in love with Lin Kesong, and Jiang Qianfan also recovered his sense of taste. In the culinary competition, Lin Kesong won the championship in one fell swoop, and in love, he and Jiang Qianfan finally achieved a positive result.

Cast

Main  

 Ruan Jingtian as Jiang Qianfan
 Song Zu'er as Lin Kesong
 Liu Dongqin as Song Yiran
 Wang Ruizi as Chu Ting

Supporting 

 Wang Zhuocheng as Victor Quentin
 Xu Jiawen as Elise Quentin
 Liu Linger as Lin Xiaoyu
 Zhang Junming as Li Yan
 Lu Siyu as Dr. Xie
 Qiao Yuting as Mrs. Quentin
 Andrey Razev as Boris
 Rambo as Blue
 Shi Yu as Lin Feng
 Wang Kan as Huang Shi
 Zhang Fan as Lin Kesong's father
 Li Xiaohong as Lin Kesong's mother
 Tuo Zonghua as Thomas
 Wu Hong as Song Yisen
 Wang Siyuan as Xiao Pa
 Liu Yapeng as Barley
 Xing En as Victor's girlfriend K
 Zhang Peng as Gundam
 Luxembourg as Marco
 Wang Boqing as Ao Rixin
 Zang Zhong as Axiong
 Chang Yuan as Chang Yuan
 Zhuang Fuyi as Lili
 Chen Yang as Chef Chen
 Anqi Liu as Lin Xiaoyu

Soundtrack

Production

Props making 
The delicacies presented in the show are all Michelin-level, and the gourmet props come from professional brands from more than 15 countries and regions, including Italy, Germany, the United Kingdom, Denmark, Sweden, Canada, Thailand, etc., including nearly a thousand pieces of top kitchen utensils and Tableware and other items; the crew also specially invited some independent designer brands, tailor-made for the setting of the top international food part in the plot, and the personality of the characters in the play. In addition, the crew also invited more than ten experts to form a gourmet consultant team to give advice on the selection of ingredients, production technology, dish design, and even food presentation. At the same time, the behind-the-scenes team of the show also built more than 2,000 square meters of shed built-in scenery.

Script writing 
The play has conducted research on the content of the plot, integrating a series of elements such as food, inspiration, love, and youth. The storyline is more plump and delicate.

Shooting process 
On May 28, 2019, the show was officially launched; on September 11, the show was announced to be completed.

References

External links

2022 Chinese television series debuts
2022 Chinese television series endings
Chinese drama television series
Television shows based on Chinese novels
Mandarin-language television shows
Chinese television series
Zhejiang Television original programming
Youku original programming
IQIYI original programming
Tencent original programming